Sixteenth Street Heights is a large neighborhood of rowhouses, duplexes, and American Craftsman and American Foursquare detached houses in Northwest Washington, D.C.

Geography

Definitions of Sixteenth Street Heights' boundaries vary, although the neighborhood can be broadly outlined by 16th Street on the west, Georgia Avenue on the east, Missouri Avenue to the north, and Arkansas Avenue to the south. The 16th Street Heights Tax Assessment Neighborhood is defined as 16th Street on the west, Missouri Avenue on the north, Georgia Avenue on the east, and Upshur Street on the south.  However, it is also common to view Kennedy Street or Longfellow Street as the northern border of 16th Street Heights.  All of 16th Street Heights lies within ZIP code 20011.

Adjoining neighborhoods include:
 Brightwood (north of Missouri Avenue)
 Brightwood Park (northeast of Georgia Avenue and Kennedy Street)
 Columbia Heights (south of Spring Road)
 Crestwood (west of 16th Street)
 Park View (southeast of New Hampshire Avenue)
 Petworth (east of Georgia Avenue)

Transportation

 S1, S2, S4 and S9 Metrobus lines run north-south along 16th Street.
 52, 54, and 59 Metrobus lines run north-south along 14th Street.
 70 and 79 Metrobus lines run north-south along Georgia Avenue.
 E2, E3, and E4 Metrobus lines run along Military Road west of 14th Street, north-south along 14th Street, and along Kennedy Street west of 14th Street.

Culture

Sixteenth Street Heights is one of the most demographically diverse neighborhoods in the city. The homes along 16th Street and its surrounding corridor are primarily owned by affluent residents, while the commercial corridors of 14th Street and Georgia Avenue cater to middle- and lower-middle-class Hispanic and African American customers.

Commercial Areas

Unlike the neighboring areas of Brightwood, Columbia Heights, and Petworth, 16th Street Heights has few commercial districts.  Aside from a handful of corner shops in other areas of the neighborhood, businesses are confined to Georgia Avenue, 14th Street between Buchanan Street and Decatur Street, and the area surrounding the intersection of 14th Street, Colorado Avenue, and Kennedy Street.  The Columbia Heights business district also extends up to Shepherd Street in the southern end of the neighborhood.  Many residents drive elsewhere for most of their shopping.

The 14th and Colorado area was once home to a popular restaurant, Colorado Kitchen, and Twins Lounge, a notable jazz club. Both have closed.

Churches

More than 45 churches line 16th Street between Silver Spring, Maryland, and Lafayette Square. They sought to build a meetinghouse on the site with a  steeple. Neighborhood outcry was fierce; many residents displayed lawn signs that read, "Too Big, Too Much, Too Many." Opponents of the church sought to extend southward the Sixteenth Street Heights overlay zone, which is divided into SSH-1 from Military Road to Colorado Avenue and SSH-2 from Colorado to Decatur. Both restrict non-residential uses and associated parking by requiring Board of Zoning Adjustment approval. After much discussion, approval was granted to build the church, which was completed in October 2012 and is now home to two Mormon congregations: the Washington, DC, 3rd Ward and the Mount Pleasant Spanish-speaking Branch.

Recreation
Sixteenth Street Heights is next to Rock Creek Park, a  national park that bisects the District of Columbia.  Park facilities near 16th Street Heights include the Carter Barron Amphitheater and the William H.G. Fitzgerald Tennis Center, which is the home of the Citi Open tournament (formerly, Legg Mason Tennis Classic).

The Upshur Recreation Center at 4300 Arkansas Avenue has a baseball/softball field, two basketball courts, a computer lab, a kitchen, a medium-sized multi-purpose room, a playground, and a swimming pool. The Twin Oaks Community Garden, at 1425 Taylor Street, has 40 plots and hosts a Junior Master Gardener Program.

History

A part of Washington County until passage of the District of Columbia Organic Act of 1871, Sixteenth Street Heights was developed as a series of subdivisions.

Streetcar lines on 14th Street and Georgia Avenue accelerated the growth of the area.  The 14th Street line, which originally stopped at Park Road, was extended in late 1906 to spur growth in the area.  Two historic streetcar facilities are currently used by Metrobus: the Capital Traction Company car barn at 4615 14th Street, NW, is now the Northern Division garage, and the 14th and Colorado turnaround is the terminal for some 52, 53, and 54 buses.

The initial generation of residents was largely white and Jewish. In the 1960s, the neighborhood became mostly African-American.

In the 21st century, Sixteenth Street Heights has seen a tremendous transformation.  Houses on every street are being renovated inside and out. Many young families have moved in because homes in Sixteenth Street Heights tend to be more affordable than similar ones in many other neighborhoods in DC and close-in suburbs. They are also attracted by the diverse housing stock and the proximity to Carter Barron Amphitheater and Rock Creek Park.

Saul's Addition

Much of 16th Street Heights was once part of Maple Grove Farm, an  nursery acquired in May 1854 by John Hennessy Saul, who led improvements of the Mall, Capitol, and White House grounds.  By 1892, Saul's son, Bernard Francis Saul, founded the B.F. Saul Company to sell land in individual lots and take notes as mortgages to speed the sale.

The subdivision known as Saul's Addition was generally bounded by Buchanan Street, Piney Branch Road, Gallatin Street, and Georgia Avenue.  Two public buildings were planned: the John Dickson Home for Aged Men (now occupied by the Kingsbury Center) and West Elementary School (which has been replaced by a modern building on the same site).

Numerous restrictions were put in the deeds of Saul's Addition lots.  Some, including the requirement that all homes be fully detached and the prohibition of commercial and multifamily buildings, remain largely in effect through zoning laws.  Others have been dropped or ruled illegal, such as the restriction on the sale of lots to people of color, which was struck down in 1948 by the Supreme Court in Shelley v. Kraemer.

Fourteenth Street Terrace

The area to the north of Saul's Addition was subdivided as Fourteenth Street Terrace.  While similar to Saul's Addition, the deeds did not prohibit semi-detached houses, and many duplexes can be seen on the 1300 blocks of Gallatin, Hamilton, and Ingraham Streets.

Politics
Sixteenth Street Heights is represented as part of Ward 4 on the Council of the District of Columbia. Muriel Bowser served as councilperson before she became the city's mayor in 2015. Janeese Lewis George is the current Ward 4 councilperson.  Most of Sixteenth Street Heights lies within Advisory Neighborhood Commission 4C.

Three neighborhood organizations serve 16th Street Heights: the 16th Street Heights Civic Association; the 16th Street Neighborhood Association; and the Carter Barron East Neighborhood Association, whose boundaries are Decatur Street to the south, Longfellow Street to the north and 13th Street to the east. The community is also served by the Friends Of The 16th Street Heights Parks.

Former Chancellor of District of Columbia Public Schools Michelle Rhee used to live in the neighborhood.

References

External links 

 Sixteenth Street Heights Neighborhood Association

American Foursquare architecture in Washington, D.C.
American Craftsman architecture in Washington, D.C.
 
Neighborhoods in Northwest (Washington, D.C.)